Lampetis torquata is a species of beetle in the Buprestidae family, that can be found in Central & South America in countries such as Peru and Bolivia.

References 

Buprestidae
Beetles described in 1823